Stygodiaptomus petkovskii is a species of crustacean in the family Diaptomidae. It is found in Bosnia and Herzegovina and Croatia.

See also
 Stygodiaptomus kieferi

References

Diaptomidae
Freshwater crustaceans of Europe
Taxonomy articles created by Polbot
Crustaceans described in 1991